Orange Farm ("Farma") is a township located approximately  from Johannesburg in the Gauteng Province of South Africa. It is the southernmost township of the City of Johannesburg Metropolitan Municipality. Its name, a misnomer given that oranges are grown in orchards instead of farms, has Dutch origins. It is one of the youngest townships in South Africa, with the original inhabitants, laid-off farm workers, taking up residency in 1988. Support for the population came slowly mostly from people who were tenants at the larger township of Soweto.

The Orange Farm Water Crisis Committee, an offshoot of the South African Anti-Privatization Forum (AFP), has been very vocal and active against the privatization of water.

Approximately 85% of the people work in Johannesburg. Most of the people use trains to get to work. 35% of the residents are unemployed.

Infrastructure

Orange Farm is a rapidly growing township with great infrastructural developments each year. The township has a large main clinic (Stretford Clinic) and several minor clinics. The township's main roads are tarred and several minor streets may be tarred but in questionable condition. Orange farm has a small official library, permanent housing for many residents (mainly government housing) . Electricity is readily available to most places with only a few areas without electricity (including the Squatter camp in Drieziek 5). The town has a large multi-purpose community center.

However, these improvements come with financial costs, which most of the citizens living in Orange Farm cannot afford. The ongoing privatization of Orange Farm has also drawn much criticism from social justice and human rights groups as they have pointed out that local small businesses keep dying. This can also be linked to the rising number of foreign owned shops in the area. A lot has been done to improve Orange Farm; it now has more than two parks and a two floor mall (Eyethu Orange Farm Mall). However, nearly all areas still need improvement.

Parks
Mountain Road Park (opened 12 October 2014) is situated in Orange Farm Ext 2, 1 km away from Eyethu Orange Farm Mall. This park sits where there used to be a soccer/football pitch of Ext 2 (Liver Pool Grounds).

Most of the leisure facilities are not well maintained.

Education

High schools
Vulanindlela Secondary School
Leshata Secondary School
Mphethi Mahlatsi Secondary School
Aha-thuto Secondary School
Jabulile Secondary School
Thamsanqa Secondary School
Thetha Secondary School
Vutomi Secondary School
Isikhumbuzo Secondary School
Siyaphambili Secondary School
Sinqobile Secondary School
Masibambane College
Raphela Secondary School
Qoqa Secondary School
Orange Farm Secondary School

Primary schools
Nomini Primary School
Stretford Primary School
Goven mbeki primary school               
Matiwane combined school           
Itemoheng primary school
Orange farm primary school
Vulindlela primary school
Zonk'izizwe primary school
Qoqizizwe primary school
Madume Primary School
Rekgutlile Primary School
Amsai Primary School
Steve Biko Primary School
Intlonipho Primary School
Laus Deo Primary School
Moyisela Primary School 
Radipapi Primary School
Pudumo primary school
Reamohetsoe Primary School

Gauteng Digital Schools
In 2015, the first stage in the Gauteng Digital Schools project was launched. The Gauteng Department of Education aims to transform all schools in the province to paperless schools. The project is headed by the MEC for Education, Panyaza Lesufi. The project began with replacing traditional chalkboards with large, touch-operated electronic screens and every learner receiving a Huawei 10" tablet computer. For 2015, the changes were only made to grade 12 classes and students. Most government schools in the province (Orange Farm included) were equipped with "smart" grade 12 classes. If the project succeeds all schools and grades in Orange Farm will become completely paperless and digitalised.

Climate
Köppen-Geiger climate classification system classifies its climate as subtropical highland (Cwb).

References

Johannesburg Region G
Townships in Gauteng